Ahmanti Booker (born March 27, 1995), professionally known as Monte Booker is an American producer from Chicago, Illinois. He is part of the musical collective Zero Fatigue, and has worked with artists such as Smino, Ravyn Lenae, Noname, Saba, Mick Jenkins, Sango, Ari Lennox and JID, among others.

Career
Monte Booker grew up in the South Side of Chicago listening to artists such as Outkast, Gucci Mane, Radiohead and Coldplay. He started producing in 2011 with FL Studio incorporating trap music and jazz as well as organic sounds in his music. In 2013, he met St. Louis artists Smino, Jay2 and Bari through studio manager Chris Classick, and joined the collective Zero Fatigue, along with Ravyn Lenae. He also became a member of Soulection Radio and released an EP on October 23, 2015, as part of their White Label series. The song "Kolors" became a viral hit in 2020 from TikTok streams, entering the Spotify's Viral 50 Charts.

Booker went on to produce projects for Zero Fatigue such as blkjuptr, Moon Shoes, Midnight Moonlight, blkswn, Noir, and MSTRGLSS. In 2016, he also worked with Chicago artists Noname, Mick Jenkins, and Saba on the albums Telefone, The Healing Component, and Bucket List Project.

In 2019, Booker was invited to Dreamville's recording sessions for the compilation Revenge of the Dreamers III by J. Cole. He produced three songs on the album, "Late Night", "Spin Move", and "Passcode". In 2020 and 2021, he has worked with other artists including Spillage Village and VanJess. On February 1, 2021, Booker released an instrumental mixtape titled Lil Sounds Tape.

Artistry
Monte Booker has credited producers such as Timbaland, Flying Lotus, The Neptunes, and Kanye West, as his major influences. Speaking about this, he said "what [they were] doing with music kind of inspired me to incorporate my influence to make it my own type of vibe." His sound has been described as percussive and organic production with "an eclectic amalgamation of Hip-Hop, R&B, and melody-heavy electronic sounds."

Discography

Extended plays
 Soulection White Label: 016 (2015)

Instrumental mixtapes
 Lil Sounds Tape (2021)

Production discography

2014
Smino - Smellin Like a Re-Up - Single
 00. "Smellin Like a Re-Up"

2015
Smino - S!Ck S!Ck S!Ck
 01. "Ruby Red"
 02. "Ballet" (featuring Bari)
 03. "Raw"

Ravyn Lenae - Moon Shoes
 01. "Venezuela Trains"
 03. "Blossom Dearie"
 04. "Recess"
 05. "Free Room"
 06. "Sleep Talking"
 08. "Everything Above"

Monte Booker - Soulection White Label: 016
 01. "Flight"
 02. "Kolors" (featuring Smino)
 03. "Homealone"
 04. "Baby" (featuring Ravyn Lenae)

Smino - Blkjuptr
 01. "Blkjuptr"
 02. "Zoom"
 03. "Runnin'" (featuring Jay2)
 04. "Poppa" (featuring Julian Bell)
 05. "Oxygen"

Smino - Ciabatta - Single
 00. "Ciabatta"

2016
Smino - Kajun - Single
 00. "Kajun" (featuring Jean Deaux & Phoelix)

Ravyn Lenae - Alive - Single
 00. "Alive"

Noname - Telefone
 02. "Sunny Duet" (with theMIND) (produced with Cam O'bi)

Mick Jenkins - The Healing Component
 14. "Angles" (featuring Xavier Omär & Noname) (produced with Cam O'bi & THEMpeople)

Saba - Bucket List Project
 12. "California" (featuring Ravyn Lenae & Phoelix) (produced with Phoelix & Daoud)

2017
Ravyn Lenae - Midnight Moonlight
 02. "Unknown"
 03. "Spice'" (solo or remix with Smino)
 04. "Hiatus (Interlude)"
 05. "Oxygen"
 06. "Sleep Talking"

Sango - De Mim, Pra Você
 06. "Bem-Estar"

Smino - Blkswn
 01. "Wild Irish Roses"
 02. "Maraca"
 03. "Glass Flows"
 04. "Flea Flicka" (featuring Bari)
 05. "Spit Shine"
 06. "Netflix & Dusse"
 07. "Anita"
 08. "Lobby Kall"	
 09. "Edgar Allen Poe'd Up" (featuring theMIND)	
 11. "B Role"	
 12. "Blkoscars" (featuring Jay2)	
 14. "Long Run" (featuring Via Rosa) (produced with Phoelix)
 15. "Innamission"	
 16. "Silk Pillows" (featuring Akenya) (produced with THEMpeople)
 17. "Ricky Millions" (featuring Drea Smith) (produced with J. Bird)
 18. "Amphetamine" (featuring Bari, Jean Deaux & Noname) (produced with Phoelix & J.Robb)

Roseangelica - Butta - Single
 00. "Butta"

Bari - Protein - Single
 00. "Butta"

Hoosier Scott - Shade Spectrum
 04. "How Would I?"

Didi Park - Neon Bandages
 06. "B&W Movies are Voodoo" (produced with JNTHN STEIN)
 08. "Method Acting"

Zero Fatigue - Manegos - Single
 00. "Manegos" (featuring Bari, Smino, and Jay2)

Monte Booker - KOMPANY - Single
 00. "KOMPANY" (featuring Phoelix & Smino)

2018
Phoelix - TEMPO
 14. "Taranphoeno" (featuring Smino and Jean Deaux) (produced with Phoelix)

KYLE - Light of Mine
 11. "ShipTrip"

Smino - NØIR
 03. "Klink"
 05. "Spinz"
 06. "Summer Salt" (featuring Bari)
 07. "Z4L" (featuring Bari & Jay2)
 08. "Merlot"
 09. "We Got The Biscuits"
 12. "Low Down Derrty Blues"
 13. "Fenty Sex" (featuring Dreezy)	
 14. "Bam 2x"
 18. "Verizon" (produced with Da-P)

Bari - The Prefix
 01. "Tortas"
 02. "Glacier"
 03. "Intrigue" (featuring Smino)

Zara Bash - Heaven on Earth
 05. "Bad4Me" (featuring Ty Safari)

2019
Bari - MSTRGLSS
 01. "Ooze"
 04. "Relax"
 05. "Ice Cup"
 06. "Eya"
 08. "Luhbish"
 10. "Caress"
 11. "Fluid"
 12. "Joi"
 13. "Stamina"

Ash Jetson - 814CK.HO13
 04. "used to."

Monte Booker - Interstellar - Single
 00. "Interstellar" (featuring Bari)

Jay2 - 4 Tha Wait
 01. "Are You OK?" 
 02. "Pomegranate"
 04. "Dork" (featuring Smino)
 05. "Dropped"
 07. "Shoppin'"

MFnMelo - What a Life - Single
 00. What a Life (featuring Saba)

MFnMelo- Everybody Eats
 04. "Flow Seats"
 09. "Notice"
 10. "What a Life" (featuring Saba)

ICECOLDBISHOP - Creep - Single
 00. Creep (featuring Mick Jenkins) (produced with Naz)

Smino - High 4 Da Highladays
 01. "Sleigh" (featuring Monte Booker & Masego) (produced with Masego)

2020
Dreamville - Revenge of the Dreamers III: Director's Cut
 22. "Late Night" (with Cozz and Omen featuring Buddy and Landstrip Chip)
 23. "Spin Move" (with Bas featuring Saba, Smino and The Hics)
 26. "Passcode" (with Ari Lennox featuring Buddy, Smino, Mez and Guapdad 4000) (produced with Christo)

Ravyn Lenae - Insecure: Music From The HBO Original Series, Season 4
 09. "Rewind" (produced with Phoelix)

Hansel Mac - Limbo
 01. "Mario" (featuring Saiki Music & Zagor)

Smino - Madden NFL 21
 14. "Backstage Pass" (with Monte Booker and The Drums)

Spillage Village - Spilligion
 06. "Judas" (with JID featuring Ari Lennox, Buddy, Chance the Rapper and Masego) (additional production from Mesita)

Femdot - Buy One, Get One Free Vol. 1
 01. "Lifetime" (featuring Saba)

Bari - Fuck It... Burn It All Down
 13. "One Night"
 15. "Heart Is Valuable"

Plvto - Hangout 4
 04. "Apple"
 06. "Hues"

Florence The Infinite - This Ain't That
 00. "This Ain't That" (featuring Bunge)

Lord Red - Tired
 00. "Tired"

2021
Monte Booker - Lil Sounds Tape
 01. "Maple"
 02. "Stay"
 03. "Feels Good"
 04. "Astro"
 05. "Shordie"
 06. "I Been Rollin" (produced with Phoelix)
 07. "Transition"
 08. "I Luv U All"	
 09. "FM"

VanJess - Homegrown
 03. "Roses" (produced with Da-P)

Jay2 - Send Heartss
 02. "As Cold As It Gets"

Symphani Soto - Energy - Single
 00. "Energy"

reggie - Ain't Gon Stop Me - Single
 00. "Ain't Gon Stop Me" (produced with Kenny Beats)

Felly - Everybody Loves You - Single
 00. "Everybody Loves You" (featuring Kota the Friend)

Vince Staples - Vince Staples
 05. "Taking Trips" (produced with Kenny Beats)

Pink Siifu - Gumbo'!
 15. "Voicemails Uptown" (featuring Monte Booker, Turich Benjy, Lance Skiiiwalker, JayBee Lamahj, VCR & Nelson Bandela)

Shane Eagle - Skydream - Single
 00. "Skydream"

Maxo Kream - Weight of the World
 07. "Don't Play With Shawty Ass" (produced with Naz)
 11. "Whole Lotta" (produced with Teej)
 16. "Believe" (featuring Don Toliver) (produced with Smino)

Mick Jenkins - Elephant In the Room
 09. "Truffles" (produced with Renzell)

2022
Saba - Few Good Things
 08. "A Simpler Time" (featuring Mereba) (produced with Daoud & Jacob Rochester)

JayBaby TheGreaty - Orange Belt
 07. "2 Fired Up"

Ravyn Lenae - Hypnos
 02. "Venom"
 08. "Higher"
 09. "3D" (featuring Smino) (produced with Phoelix)
 10. "Satellites" (produced with Luke Titus & Steve Lacy)
 11. "Lullabye"

JID - The Forever Story
 01. “Galaxy”
 12. “Just in Time” (featuring Kenny Mason and Lil Wayne) (produced with Christo)
 15. “Lauder Too” (featuring Ravyn Lenae and Eryn Allen Kane) (produced with James Blake, Thundercat and Groove)

Pandi - #Batposting
 01. “Precious”

Mavi - Laughing So Hard It Hurts
 03. “Baking Soda” (produced with Amarahbeats)
 12. “Trip” (featuring Amindi) (produced with AmarahBeats)

Smino - Luv 4 Rent
 01. “4rm Da Source”
 02. “No L’s” (produced with Karl Banx)
 03. “90 Proof” (featuring J. Cole) (produced with Groove)
 04. “Pro Freak” (featuring Doechii & Fatman Scoop) (produced with Childish Major, Phoelix, DJ Dahi & Nami)
 06. “Louphoria” (featuring Cruza) (produced with Adam Sylvester, AJ Thomas & AmarahBeats)
 07. “Blu Billy”
 09. “Modennaminute” (featuring Lucky Daye & Phoelix) (produced with Phoelix)
 11. “Garden Lady” (produced with Smino, Sucuki & Phoelix)
 12. “Settle Down” (featuring Cory Henry & Ravyn Lenae) (produced with Charlie Myles)
 14. “Curtains” (produced with Cory Henry)

Tours
Headlining
 European Tour  (2016)
 Europe Tour (2017)
 Kouple Drillz Tour  (2018)
 North America Tour  (2018)

Supporting
 ITCO Tour  (2018)

References

1995 births
Living people
American male musicians
American electronic musicians
Electronic dance music DJs
American DJs
Record producers from Illinois
Musicians from Chicago